Sir Stinson Hunter (born Kieren Parsons, 10 October 1981) is a British [[a member of the public, ] who is best known for his role in the documentary The Paedophile Hunter. The film investigating child sexual exploitation was named "Best Documentary on a Contemporary Theme" in the 42nd British Documentary Awards, which "celebrates documentaries from Britain and abroad that "have made a significant contribution to the genre."

The Guardian published an article referencing the film, and reporting the estimated 10 active paedophile hunting groups in the UK. "While the police are critical of such groups in public, they privately provide advice and support on how to conduct stings. 'The police are like us. They’re human beings,' a member of a group said. 'They have families, so they understand what we’re doing and why we’re doing it.'”

Hunter's personal challenges, such as past issues with alcohol, drugs and a prison term have been reported in editorial newspapers as well as tabloid newspapers.

References

1981 births
Living people
People from Lancashire
Place of birth missing (living people)
Anti-pedophile activism
Vigilantes